11 listopada is a 2008 Polish war film directed by Kamil Kulczycki and Urszula Szałata. The film presents a series of events which led to the first execution of civilians in occupied Poland.

The first official screening of the film took place on November 9, 2008 at the Wisła cinema in Warsaw.

For the production of the film, Kamil Kulczycki and Urszula Szałata received in 2008 the award of the Society of Zielonka Friends in the category "Event of the Year 2008".

Plot 
11 listopada is set shortly before and at the beginning of World War II. It tells the story of a group of Scouts from Zielonka, a small town near Warsaw, who, finding themselves unable to come to terms with the German occupation, decided to continue in secret their scouting activity. One night, on the eve of 11 November 1939 (Polish Independence Day), they put up in the streets of the town 15 hand-made posters with the text of Rota (The Oath), a poem and an anthem by Maria Konopnicka. In the gloomy reality of the German occupation this act was supposed to express hope. Perhaps they were dreaming of a moment of hesitation from a passer-by, rising hearts, a kind smile at this manifestation of national solidarity.

Cast 
 Maciej Skowronek as Jan Rudzki
 Artur Jarząbek as Kazimierz Stawiarski
 Mariusz Domagała as Stanisław Golcz
 Bartosz Kulikowski as Zbigniew Dymek
 Paweł Marczuk as Józef Wyrzykowski
 Sławomir Koc as Józef Kulczycki

References

External links 
 

Polish war films
2000s Polish-language films
2008 films
2000s war films
Polish World War II films
Films about Polish resistance during World War II